Dannabang Kuwabong is a Ghanaian Canadian. He is an author, poet and professor of Caribbean Literature and Culture. He was born in Nanville in the Upper West Region of Ghana. He has written many anthologies and edited academic journals.

Education 
Dannabang Kuwabong had his tertiary education at University of Ghana where he was awarded Bachelor of Arts (Honors) degree in English. He was also obtained a Magisteriate in Environmental Studies (MES) in Environmental Studies, York University, Toronto, Canada. He further went to University of Stirling, Stirling, UK where he  did his master's degree in  Modern Poetry in English and was given  Master of Letters (MLITT). He then went to McMaster University, Hamilton, Canada to do his  doctoral degree in English in 1997

Achievements 
He has his works published in ARIEL: A Review of International English Literature, Journal for the Association for Research on Mothering, Journal of Dagaare Studies, La Torre, Sargasso, Canadian Women's Studies /les cahiers de la femmes and Universitas. He co- authored  English textbooks for Senior High School English Textbooks I, II, III

Career 
He is currently a teacher of Caribbean literature at the University of Puerto Rico, San Juan

Books 

 Konga and other Dagaaba Folktales.
 Visions of Venom (poetry)1995 
 Echoes from Dusty Rivers (poetry)
 Voices from Kibuli Country (Poem)2003
 Caribbean Blues and Love's Genealogy(Poetry) 2008
 Naa Ko̳nga 1992
 Myth Performance in the African Diasporas(Ritual, Theatre, and Dance) 2013
 Mothers and daughters
 Apocrypha of Nanny's secrets : the rhetoric of recovery in Africaribbean women's poetry 1997

References 

Year of birth missing (living people)
Living people
Canadian people of Ghanaian descent
Caribbean literature
Rivers State University people
Academic staff of the University of Port Harcourt
Academic staff of the University of Ghana
Academic staff of McMaster University
University of Puerto Rico faculty